Tal-Bir Redoubt, also known as Wied Musa Redoubt, is a redoubt in the limits of Mellieħa, Malta. It was built by the Order of Saint John in 1715–1716 as one of a series of coastal fortifications around the Maltese Islands. Today, the redoubt lies in ruins.

History
Tal-Bir Redoubt was built in 1715–1716 as part of the first building programme of coastal fortifications in Malta. It was part of a chain of fortifications that defended the northern coast of Malta, which also included Aħrax Tower, several batteries, redoubts and entrenchments. The nearest fortifications to Tal-Bir Redoubt are Wied Musa Battery to the west and Qortin Redoubt to the east.

The redoubt originally consisted of a pentagonal platform with a low parapet. A rectangular blockhouse was located at the centre of its gorge. It was not armed with any artillery.

Construction of Tal-Bir Redoubt cost around 1213.8.4.3 scudi.

Present day
Today, the redoubt lies in ruins and is almost completely destroyed. Only remains of the pentagonal platform and part of its counterscarp still exist.

References

External links

National Inventory of the Cultural Property of the Maltese Islands

Redoubts in Malta
Mellieħa
Hospitaller fortifications in Malta
Military installations established in 1715
Ruins in Malta
Limestone buildings in Malta
National Inventory of the Cultural Property of the Maltese Islands
18th-century fortifications
1715 establishments in Malta
18th Century military history of Malta